The 1952–53 Segunda División season was the 22nd since its establishment and was played between 13 September 1952 and 3 May 1953.

Overview before the season
32 teams joined the league, including two relegated from the 1951–52 La Liga and 6 promoted from the 1951–52 Tercera División.

Relegated from La Liga
Las Palmas
Atlético Tetuán

Promoted from Tercera División'''

Avilés
Burgos
España Industrial
Cacereño
Orihuela
Jaén

Group North

Teams

League table

Results

Top goalscorers

Top goalkeepers

Group South

Teams

League table

Results

Top goalscorers

Top goalkeepers

Promotion playoffs

League table

Results

Relegation playoffs

Group 1

League table

Results

Group 2

League table

Results

Group 3

External links
BDFútbol

1952-53
2
Spain